The Malaysian identity card, is the compulsory identity card for Malaysian citizens aged 12 and above. The current identity card, known as MyKad, was introduced by the National Registration Department of Malaysia on 5 September 2001 as one of four MSC Malaysia flagship applications and a replacement for the High Quality Identity Card (Kad Pengenalan Bermutu Tinggi), Malaysia became the first country in the world to use an identification card that incorporates both photo identification and fingerprint biometric data on an in-built computer chip embedded in a piece of plastic.

Besides the main purpose of the card as a validation tool and proof of citizenship other than the birth certificate, MyKad may also serve as a valid driver's license, an ATM card, an electronic purse, and a public key, among other applications, as part of the Malaysian Government Multipurpose Card (GMPC) initiative, if the bearer chooses to activate the functions.

Other cards which are currently in use or soon to be introduced in the GMPC initiative and share similar features are:
 MyKid – for Malaysian citizens under age of 12 including newborns (non-compulsory);
 MyPR – for Malaysian Permanent Residents;
 MyTentera – for Malaysian Armed Forces personnel;

Etymology
The term MyKad is a compound of two words with ambiguous meanings; namely My and Kad.

My can be:
 the ISO 3166-1 alpha-2 code for Malaysia; or
 the English word my

Kad can be:
 the Malay word for card; or
 the acronym for Kad Akuan Diri or Personal Identification Card; or
 the acronym for Kad Aplikasi Digital or Digital Application Card.

Technical specifications
The initial MyKad was a contact card solution developed and manufactured by IRIS Corporation. Made of PC with the dimensions in the ISO/IEC 7816 ID-1 format (standard credit card format), the initial card had a 32kb EEPROM (Electronically Erasable Programmable Read-Only Memory) embedded chip running on M-COS (MyKad Chip Operating System). In November 2002, the capacity was increased to 64kb.

The upgraded and current version of the MyKad is a hybrid card containing two chips for both contact and contactless interfaces. Currently, this hybrid type MyKad is only issued in Malaysian states that employ the Touch 'n Go application.

The MyKad chip has a data retention up to 20 years, while the card itself has a lifespan of 10 years and has been tested according to the ISO 10373 standard.

Eligibility and adoption
All Malaysian citizens and permanent residents 12 years old or above are eligible for a MyKad. From 2001, it gradually replaced an older Malaysian Identity Card system, that had been in use since 1949 under British colonial rule, with the intention of becoming ubiquitous by 2007. Children are issued with a MyKid after birth. This card is "upgraded" to a MyKad on the 12th birthday. The MyKad must be replaced when a person reaches 18 years old, as it is a requirement that the photograph be "current".

Adoption was optional but was spurred by the waiving of the application fee of between RM20 and RM50 until 31 December 2005. As of 27 December 2005, 1,180,208 Malaysians still held an old identity card. After the waiving period ended on 31 December 2005, each new first-time application comes with a fee of RM10.

Structure of the National Registration Identity Card Number (NRIC)
The current format of the Malaysian identity card number, introduced in 1990, features 12 digits separated into three block by hyphens, as illustrated below:

YYMMDD-PB-###G

The above format is the official format as printed on the official identity documents e.g. MyKad. However, for database purposes (e.g. sorting), the NRIC Number may have its hyphens omitted, hence:

YYMMDDPB###G

The first six digits YYMMDD signify the person's date of birth in the ISO 8601:2000 format; for example, a person born on 16 September 1963, would have 630916 as the first six digits of their identity card. A person born on 1 January 1900 would have 000101 as the first digits, same with a person born on 1 January 2000. In cases where the person's actual date of birth according to the Gregorian calendar is uncertain, the date on which the person first applied for a MyKad is used (which becomes the person's birthday for official purposes), noted by an asterisk (*).

PB, the seventh and eighth digit, based on the place of birth of the person, which will be referred from the birth certificate upon application of the MyKad.

###, the ninth through eleventh digit is the generic special number generated by the National Registration Department of Malaysia's computer system. Usually, a person born prior and in the year 1999 will have the number started with 5## or 6## or 7## while a person born after and in the year 2000 will have the number started with 0##. Sometimes, the number reaches 1##, 2## and even 3## for high birth rate areas.

G, the 12th digit represents the gender of the person. The odd numbers 1 / 3 / 5 / 7 / 9 denote male while the even numbers 2 / 4 / 6 / 8 / 0 denote female. This is a myth that has been debunked by the home minister of Malaysia in 2017. The last 4-digits are computer generated and not indicative of gender. Many Malaysians received the ID number that is not represented by the format above. 

On the back of the card, there is an additional 2-digit number after the 12-digit number to indicate the number of MyKad which a person previously held.

Place of birth

Prior to 2001, originally, any person who was born abroad used digit 71 or 72 in their identity card number (High Quality Identity Card), regardless with or without at least one legal ascendant with Malaysian citizenship. It is estimated that about 171,023 registered voters who born abroad and used digit 71 or 72 in MyKad.

However, since 2001, any baby who was born abroad after 2001 is referred according to their place of birth rather than general digit 71 or 72 in their MyKad. It also affected any person (including citizen or non-citizen) who was born abroad regardless of their year of birth; who applying MyKad without holding High Quality Identity Card after 2001. Despite that, if any person born abroad who already had High Quality Identity Card which means they registered their identity card before 2001, they still retain digit 71 or 72 to be used in their MyKad identity card number. High Quality Identity Card was in use as the Malaysia's identity card from 1990 to 2001. After 2001, a person with High Quality Identity Card is expected to renew their High Quality Identity Card with new MyKad.

Applications on MyKad
The MyKad project was developed was originally intended to have four functions:
 Identity card, including fingerprints and photo
 Driving licence
 Travel document in Malaysia and several neighbouring countries. However, a conventional passport is still required for international travel: the card is aimed at reducing congestion at the border by enabling the use of unmanned gates using biometric (fingerprint) identification.
 Storage of health information

Current applications
Four further applications were added before or during its initial release,
 e-cash, an "electronic wallet" system intended for low-value, high-volume transactions (the maximum limit is US$500)
 ATM integration
 Touch 'n Go, Malaysia's toll road tolling system and also public transport payment Users can transfer an amount of money into the cards so they can just use their MyKads to purchase a ticket for bus and train rides.
 Digital certificate, commonly known as Public Key Infrastructure (PKI), only supported by the 64Kb version (implemented by the end of 2002)

At this time, most of the functions are still not widely used because they are not widely promoted.

Future / proposed applications
The extensible design of the card may be leading to functionality creep.  Further applications envisaged by the government include:
 Frequent travellers' card
 Merge with the Payment Multi-Purpose Card ('PMPC'), giving the MyKad credit and debit card functions that will pave the way for other financial uses

Personal identification
MyKad must be carried at all times. Failure to do so may incur a fine of between RM3,000 and RM20,000 or jail term of up to three years.

No unauthorised people, including security guards, are allowed to retain the MyKads of other people. Only those authorised by the National Registration Department, like the police and immigration officers, can do so.

For Muslim citizens, "Islam" is printed on the card below the picture of the holder. This is to help the enforcement of Sharia law which is only applicable to Muslims.

As the state of Sabah and Sarawak maintain separate immigration controls, citizens who have permanent residency in the state of Sabah and Sarawak are denoted by the letters "H" and "K" respectively on the bottom right corner of the card.

Public Key Infrastructure (PKI)
MyKad's Public Key Infrastructure (PKI) application allows for two digital certificates to be inserted. MyKad holders can apply and purchase the digital certificates from two of Malaysia's certification authority, MSCTrustgate.com Sdn. Bhd. and DigiCert Sdn. Bhd..

PKI allows for easy securing of private data over public telecommunications networks, thus allowing, secure electronic transactions over the Internet which include:

Online submission of tax returns
Internet banking
Secure email

MyKad as a travel document

Citizens from Peninsular Malaysia travelling to Sabah, Sarawak and Labuan can produce a MyKad on arrival to obtain a Document in Lieu of Internal Travel Document (IMM.114) for social and business visits not more than three months. Sabah and Sarawak each maintains a separate immigration control system, and Peninsular Malaysians are subject to immigration control in the two states and Federal Territories.

Malaysia and Brunei signed a frequent travellers cards (FTC) agreement on 10 September 2007, allowing Malaysian and Bruneian frequent travellers to register to use their national identity cards for travel between Malaysia and Brunei.

As Malaysia stopped issuing and renewing Restricted Passports for citizens from Peninsular Malaysia to travel to Singapore beginning 1 January 2005, Malaysia considered negotiating with Singapore to allow frequent Malaysian travellers to enter Singapore using MyKad. However, Singapore rejected the use of MyKad by frequent Malaysian travellers to enter the country, citing security concerns.

MyID
The MyID is a Malaysian Government initiative that implements the National Registration Identity Card Number as the sole reference number for Malaysians in their transactions as an individual with the government agencies.

Other cards with similar MyKad features

MyKid

MyKid is a chip-based children identity card or personal identification document issued to children under the age of 12. Introduced on 1 January 2003, MyKid contains features similar to MyKad except that it does not include a photograph and thumbprint biometric data. For registration of new birth, MyKid will be processed during the application for registration of birth. Children born before 2003 do not get a MyKid.

The term Kid refers to:
 Alternative word for child in the English language; or
 Acronym for Kad Identiti Diri or Personal Identification Card.

MyKid is issued in pink instead of blue (colour of MyKad). Visible data for MyKid in block letters include:
 The heading Kad Pengenalan Kanak-kanak Malaysia
 NRIC Numbers
 Full name 
 Permanent address 
 Gender
 Citizenship status
 Legal ascendant(s) religion

The MyKid chip currently stores only three types of data:
 Birth data e.g., information on legal ascendant(s)
 Health information e.g., immunisation records
 Education information e.g., enrolment in schools

Benefits of MyKid:
 Reduces use of paper forms when dealing with government or private agencies
 Used in transactions with departments or agencies such as hospitals or clinics for medical examination, schooling, etc.
 Portable due to its small size
 Contains security features to prevent abuse
 Uses chip technology where information can be read on the card or in the chip. The information in the chip can also be updated easily.
 Attractive design

MyPR

MyPR is an identity card or personal identification issued to residents of Malaysia with permanent resident status. All residents of Malaysia with permanent resident status are required to change their identity card to MyPR with effect from 1 June 2006. The MyPR is red and visible data include:
 The heading: Malaysia Permanent Resident Identity Card
 Full name
 NRIC number
 Permanent address
 Gender
 Permanent residence status

MyKAS

MyKAS is a temporary resident identity card issued under Regulation 5 (3) of the National Registration Regulations 1990. It is green with expiry date indicated on the card.

MyKAS must be renewed within five years.

MyTentera
The MyTentera will replace the current BAT C 10 document (Malay: Borang Angkatan Tentera C 10) (Armed Forces Form C 10).

The MyTentera will be silver and feature the Malaysian Armed Forces logo at the back top-right corner. It will also contain a 12-digit military identification number similar to the NRIC Number.

References

Further reading
 Knight, Will. "Malaysia pioneers smart cards with fingerprint data", New Scientist, 21 September 2001
 "MyKid for all newborn babies soon", The Star, 26 February 2003
 Thomas, M. Is Malaysia's MyKad the 'One Card to Rule Them All'? The Urgent Need to Develop a Proper Legal Framework for the Protection of Personal Information in Malaysia", Melbourne University Law Review, 2004
 Krishnamoorthy, M. "Easy step to amend religion in MyKad", The Star, 23 December 2005
 Sujata, V.P. "Applicants to be charged a fee from next year", The Star, 29 December 2005
 "Mad rush to beat the deadline", The Star, 30 December 2005
 "Abusive bunch forces Kepong branch to call in cops", The Star, 30 December 2005
 Anis, M.N. "Singapore 'no' to MyKad", The Star, 6 April 2005.
 Fadzil, M.M. "The Malaysian Experience: Implementing A National Multi-applications Citizen's Card" – see here for further details of the exact information stored on the card
 Raja Petra Kamarudin Give them a uniform and it goes to their heads, Malaysia Today, 13 October 2005.
 National Registration Act 1959 (Act 78) and Regulations, International Law Book Services, 15 January 2007.

External links
 MyKad website at the National Registration Department

Authentication methods
Economy of Malaysia
Malaysian nationality law
Malaysia
Malaysia